Linus Spacehead's Cosmic Crusade is a video game released in 1992 by Codemasters for the Nintendo Entertainment System. A remake of the game, retitled Cosmic Spacehead, was released in 1993 for Amiga, MS-DOS, Game Gear, Master System, and Genesis. The game features adventure elements, with locations connected by platform sections.

The game is the sequel to Linus Spacehead, which was released exclusively as part of the compilation Quattro Adventure.

Plot 
Linus is an alien from the planet Linoleum who crashed into the legendary planet Earth. After returning home and expecting a hero's welcome, Linus soon found his fellow Linomen were skeptical of the existence of the so-called "planet Earth" and decides to return to it, this time with a camera. However, he has no money (Linoleum currency is the Linobuck), and must adventure around the planet to acquire a vehicle and a camera. In his adventures, Linus leaves Linoleum (using a fake ID for Larry Flynt to compete in a bumper car contest), quashes a robot revolution in Detroitica and gets gas from an abandoned space station.

Gameplay 
The game is similar to prior titles such as Maniac Mansion (1987) and later titles such as Day of the Tentacle (1993), being an adventure game in which items must be collected and later used in specific locations in order to progress.  The player's character is directed during much of the game with the use of a cursor and written commands.  It also includes numerous short platforming sections, as well as other mini-games and puzzles.

Each major location of Planet Linoleum has a teleporting device, which can be activated using a card. However, they often leave Linus with a side-effect, required to complete a puzzle. To travel between adventure sections, Linus goes through arcade sections, where he has to reach the other side of the level, avoiding free falls, enemies and collecting Cosmic candy at the same time (after collecting 10, an extra life is added). Linus dies upon contact with enemies, so instead of speed-running (which can be done, since the levels are small), it may be more advisable to learn his foes' movement patterns and wait for a safe opening.  This is particularly true in NES Linus Spacehead's Cosmic Crusade, where Linus cannot change direction in mid-jump. Passwords are scattered at key locations.

Licensing 
Like other Codemasters games, the NES versions were not licensed by Nintendo. Linus Spacehead's Cosmic Crusade was released both as a stand-alone cartridge and as one of seven games for the Aladdin Deck Enhancer. At least in Europe, a later/updated version of the game was released as Cosmic Spacehead. There are several differences between that and the earlier version. Cosmic Spacehead includes the Pie Slap mode, and Linus can jump higher and change direction in mid-jump, which makes the platform arcade sections easier. The Mega Drive version was also included in a Codemasters "2-in-1" cartridge with Fantastic Dizzy.

All but Linus Spacehead's Cosmic Crusade include a two player mode named Pie Slap, reminiscent of Armor Ambush for the Atari 2600. While the Master System version is similar in graphics to the NES version, the gameplay is closer to the remaining versions. In the Amiga, Mega Drive and MS-DOS versions, the art style is different from the NES version.

Reception
GamePro described the Game Gear version as "a great point-and-click text adventure", additionally praising the cartoonish charm of the graphics.

References

External links 
 

1992 video games
Adventure games
Amiga games
Unauthorized video games
Codemasters games
DOS games
Game Gear games
Nintendo Entertainment System games
Sega Genesis games
Master System games
Video games scored by Allister Brimble
Video games scored by Matthew Simmonds
Video games set on fictional planets
Science fiction video games
Video games developed in the United Kingdom
Supersonic Software games
Single-player video games
Camerica games